John Campbell (19 February 1869 – 8 June 1906) was a Scottish footballer who played as a forward, primarily for Sunderland. He was the stepbrother of Sunderland manager Robert Campbell.

Club career
Having won the Scottish Cup with Renton in 1888, followed by the 1888 'World Championship' a few months later, Campbell switched to English football along with teammates John Harvey and David Hannah; he made his debut for Sunderland on 18 January 1890 against Blackburn Rovers in the FA Cup first round; Sunderland lost the game 4–2 after extra time at Leamington Road. He played for the club from 1890 to 1897, winning three Football League championships (1891–92, 1892–93 and 1894–95). In each of these seasons, Campbell was the top scorer in the competition. He also won the 1894–95 World Championship with the team, scoring two goals in the win over Heart of Midlothian. After making 186 league appearances for Sunderland, scoring 133 goals, he moved to their arch-rivals Newcastle United.

He made his Newcastle debut (again alongside John Harvey) against Woolwich Arsenal F.C. on 4 September 1897 where he also scored a goal in a 4–1 win. He led Newcastle to their first promotion in the 1898 season, overall he made 29 appearances for Newcastle scoring 12 goals; retiring to become a licensee.

Campbell played in an unofficial international match for Scotland against Canada in 1888 and later took part in the first Home Scots v Anglo-Scots trial in 1896, but he never received a full cap for his country – 1896 was the first year consideration was given to select players based in England to appear for the Scotland team.

Honours
Renton
Scottish Cup: 1887–88
Glasgow Merchants Charity Cup: 1886, 1887, 1888, 1889
Football World Championship: 1888

Sunderland
First Division: 1891–92, 1892–93, 1894–95
Football World Championship: 1895

Individual
First Division Top Scorer: 1891–92, 1892–93, 1894–95

References

External links
John Campbell's careers stats at The Stat Cat

1869 births
Scottish footballers
Sunderland A.F.C. players
Newcastle United F.C. players
Renton F.C. players
English Football League players
First Division/Premier League top scorers
1906 deaths
Association football forwards
Footballers from West Dunbartonshire
Footballers from Edinburgh